is a Japanese anime television series broadcast from January 1, 1977 to January 27, 1979, comprising 108 episodes. It is the second and longest show in the Time Bokan series by Tatsunoko Productions. The series succeeded Time Bokan and preceded Zenderman. It was also the final series to be produced by company founder Tatsuo Yoshida prior to his death.

A remake of Yatterman aired on NTV and Yomiuri TV from January 14, 2008 through September 27, 2009, with the original voice actors for the Doronbo gang. A live-action adaptation was released theatrically in March 2009. Another entry in the franchise, Yatterman Night, began airing in January 2015 to celebrate the 40th anniversary of the Time Bokan franchise.

Plot
Once all four pieces are assembled, the location to the world's largest deposit of gold will be revealed. The villainous  gang are searching for the Skull Stone. Standing in their way are Gan and Ai, who become the masked heroes Yatterman-1 and Yatterman-2, respectively. The two are aided in their adventures by a large mechanical dog, Yatterwan.

Unlike previous series in the Time Bokan franchise, Yatterman does not cover any specific time/space travel. Instead, the places where the heroes travel to and the individuals they encounter are either a homage or parody. The fictional characters or places are usually represented by purposely misspelled names or familiar actions. For example, a revolution leader is named "Yashington", in homage to George Washington; and a place resembling ancient Japan is named "Yametai" ("(I) want to stop"), as a spoof of Yamatai.

Characters

Heroes
  

Actor Portrayal: Shō Sakurai
Gan is a 13-year-old boy whose father is a famous toy designer who failed to complete the "Yatter-Wan", a dog-shaped all-terrain rescue robot. Gan is an expert mechanic, and he helps perfect his father's dream design. He forms a fighting team with his girlfriend, Ai, and names himself Yatterman-1. His weapon of choice is a kendama, which he uses as a flail and grappling hook, as well as for his special zapping attack "Kenda-Magic". He is shown to be much more careless in the 2008 version of the show and tends to frustrate Ai.

  

Actor portrayal: Saki Fukuda
Ai is Gan's girlfriend, and the only daughter of a shopkeeper who sells electrical appliances. She is Gan's loyal follower, and is often seen constructing and modifying machines with him. She is Yatterman-2, and uses a telescoping baton called "Electric Stick" to shock opponents with electric currents. In the 2008 version of the show, she often refers to things as "100%" (for example, "We are in 100% of trouble").

Omotchama is Gan's robot, and serves as the mascot of his father's toy shop. He is shaped like a large dice, and is known for his catchphrase "-da-koron" at the end of each sentence. His name comes from "omoccha", the Japanese word for "toy".

Villains

Actor portrayal: Kyoko Fukada
Doronjo (real name ) is an attractive blonde who leads the Dorombo Gang in locating the Dokuro Stone. She is known for her vanity, intelligence, and leadership, just like her counterpart Marjo from Time Bokan. Doronjo also has an iconic skull-shaped smoking pipe similar to Marjo's.

Actor portrayal: Katsuhisa Namase
Boyacky is a tall, skinny man with a large nose and moustache, just like his counterpart Grocky in Time Bokan. He is clever, lecherous, and largely responsible for the creation of the giant mechas used by the Dorombo Gang. He usually appears naked, according to his comic Bogeboge Boyacky (ボゲボゲボヤッキー).

Actor portrayal: Kendo Kobayashi
Tonzura is a short, muscular, squat man with a severe overbite and facial stubble, just like his counterpart Walsa in Time Bokan. Tonzura is the strong man of the group and does most of the heavy lifting, though he's usually quick to run away when threatened. He speaks with a kansai-ben accent.

Dokurobei is the elusive boss of the Dorombo Gang. He gives orders regarding the location of the Dokuro Stone to his subordinates in unusual ways, such as through a talking hamburger or the image of a red skull on a TV screen. Even when his leads are revealed to be inaccurate, Dokurobei is always quick to punish the Dorombo Gang for their failures.

Mechas

A dog-shaped robot, Yatterwan was designed by Gan's father as a prototype rescue robot. He is fitted with a siren and a bell, similar to other rescue vehicles, plus a joystick to control his other features. Yatterwan can fire iron pellets from his nostrils and carries two fire hoses on his back. A bone-shaped power pack, known as "Mecha-Tonic", is fed to him to allow a sudden outburst of strength in warding off deadly blows. Yatterwan's special attack is a large group of miniature robots, which exit from his mouth, and usually take the shape of land-based animals. The mini-robots use their weapons on their enemies, causing Doronbo's robots to explode and create a skull-shaped cloud.

Yatter-King was built using the damaged remains of Yatterwan. It is a much larger machine, and resembles a crossover of a fire engine with a dachshund. It comes complete with a series of new features, including a tail that serves as a firehose, a projectile launcher on its rear, and a body which acts as a mecha-carrier for a series of smaller robots. In the 2009 version, it was formed by combining Yatterwan and Yatter-zero, which has a design with a more fighting ability and a "king"-like appearance.

Yatter-Pelican is a pelican robot who appeared in the 14th episode. He is constructed by Gan as an airborne mecha for the Yatterman duo. Yatter-Pelican has a braggard, loud-mouthed personality. He feeds on a fish-shaped Mecha-Tonic for a power boost, and the mini-robots he releases are shaped like various birds. In the 2008 version, he tends to speak in bits of English in certain sentences.

Yatter-Angler is a goosefish robot who appeared in the 27th episode. He is constructed as the only all-terrain mecha for the Yatterman duo, and is equipped with a cockpit for underwater travel. The Mecha-Tonic is in the shape of a fish roe, and releases mini-robots shaped like marine creatures. He has a funny, constantly-gurgling voice, as if one was talking underwater.

Yatter-Phant is an elephant mecha, introduced in the 92nd episode as an alternate mecha-carrier alongside Yatter-King. Its most noticeable features are its ears, which flap in order to allow flight, and its trunk, which serves as a water-hose/flamethrower.

Introduced in the 58th episode, Yatter-Bull is a bulldog robot, and serves as one of the three "Action Mechas" that are carried by Yatter-King.

Yatter-Dozilla is a dinosaur-shaped robot built by Gan, and has the ability to drill underground.

 

Yatter-Yokozuna is a sumo robot.

Introduced in episode 36 of the 2008 series, Yatter-Jinbee (Yatter-Whashark) is a whale shark mecha and mecha-carrier, much like the original Yatter-King and Yatter-Phant.

 Yatter-Mogura (Yatter-Mole) is a new Talpidae-based mecha in the 2008 version, first appearing in episode 39. Like Yatter-Dozilla, he specializes in underground work.

Yatter-Dragon is an Asian dragon-based mecha, introduced in episode 50 of the 2008 version. It only seems to appear in a major crisis, often when the other robots aren't available or functional.

Villains' machines
The shape and function of their mechas is fully dependent on the theme of the scam they are running at the beginning of each episode.  Their machines usually feature a familiar interior, with Boyacky and Tonzura sitting at the sides, and Doronjo sitting in the middle, bossing them. The villains' machines are often seen packing a lot of weaponry and usually temporarily defeat Yatterman mechas at the beginning of each fight. Later in the show, the villains start to deploy their own armies of miniature robots to counter those of Yatterman.

Media

Anime

1977 television series 
The original series aired on Fuji TV between January 1, 1977 and January 27, 1979, running for 108 episodes. The series also aired in Spain, Italy, and Poland.

2008 television series 

Nearly 31 years following the previous series, a remake of the series, called , aired on YTV between January 14, 2008 and September 27, 2009, running for 60 episodes. The story is a retelling of the original series, with more modern references to suit current tastes. The opening themes are variations of "Yatterman's Theme", sung by (in order), Saemon Onyakichi, ET-KING, Yuki Nishio, Nakano-Bujo Sisters, and Toshihiko Takamizawa, with the final episode using the original version by Yamamoto. The series, along with the original show, is currently streaming in North America via Yomiura Group's planned Anime Sols video service, as of spring 2013. However, due to an unsuccessful campaign to crowd-fund the series' DVD release, the series will soon be removed from the site, with the possibility of a new crowd-funding opportunity in the future.

On August 22, 2009, an anime film based on the 2008 television series was released in Japan. Titled  and directed by Masakazu Hishida, the film opened at #10 with US$702,155 on 210 screens.

Yatterman Night

A 2015 television series, Yatterman Night, began airing in Japan on January 11, 2015, to celebrate the 40th anniversary of the Time Bokan franchise. The series takes place several years in the future and follows the descendants of the Doronbo Gang as they fight against the Yattermen, who have become corrupt. The series is licensed in North America by Funimation, who are simulcasting the series as it airs.

Live-action film 

On April 10, 2007, Nikkatsu Corporation agreed to produce two live-action movies based on two popular 1970's anime series: Yatterman and Gatchaman.

Filming began on March 27, 2008, and concluded at the end of May 2008. The film was directed by Takashi Miike, and character and mechanical designs were handled by Katsuya Terada, who worked on Blood: The Last Vampire and Cutie Honey. The film opened on March 7, 2009, and became Japan's top movie at the box office in its first week. Video label Eureka released the film on DVD and Blu-ray in the United Kingdom on May 21, 2012. Discotek Media released the film in North America in 2013.

Video games
Several video games have been released based on the series.  was released for Super Famicom on March 22, 1996. A mobile game was released in 2003, developed by Hudson Soft.

Yatterman-1 and Doronjo (assisted by Boyacky and Tonzura) appear as playable characters in the crossover fighting game, Tatsunoko vs. Capcom: Cross Generation of Heroes, released by Capcom for the Wii in Japan in 2008. An updated version, Tatsunoko vs. Capcom: Ultimate All-Stars, released internationally in 2010, adds Yatterman-2 as a playable character. Doronjo, Boyacky, and Tonzura's voice actors reprise their respective roles, whilst Yatterman-1 and Yatterman-2 are voiced by Eri Kitamura and Emiri Katō, respectively.

The Akihabara Accept skin for the AUG in Counter Strike: Global Offensive reads "Yatta!" at the end of its description.

Other appearances 
Yatterman also makes an appearance in the third episode of Sket Dance as a playable character.

Japanese pro wrestling fed Michinoku Pro is currently running a Yatterman tribute gimmick, with wrestlers Hercules Senga, Tsutomu Oosugi, and Misaki Ohata as "Yapper Man #1", "Yapper Man #2", and "Yapper Man #3". #1 and #2 have been Tohoku Tag Team Champions.

Dead or Alive 5 Last Round features character costumes for Phase-4, Kasumi, and Nyotengu, based on Yatterman-1, Yatterman-2, and Doronjo, respectively, appearing as part of the "Tatsunoko Mashup Set" downloadable content pack.

Ai Kaminari debuted as a Virtual YouTuber on October 19, 2018, with the character's visuals designed by Fly, who is known as the illustrator for the Kemono Friends manga, Kemono Friends: Welcome to Japari Park!. She was later joined by Boyacky.

References

External links
Official movie website
 Japanese News Online Yatterman Movie
 

1977 anime television series debuts
2008 anime television series debuts
2009 anime films
Comedy anime and manga
Fictional vigilantes
Fuji TV original programming
Yomiuri Telecasting Corporation original programming
Mecha anime and manga
Nippon TV original programming
Tatsunoko Production
Time Bokan Series
Virtual influencers
VTubers